The Botanischer Garten der Universität Würzburg (9 hectares) is a botanical garden maintained by the University of Würzburg. It is located at Julius-von-Sachs-Platz 4, Würzburg, Bavaria, Germany, and open daily; admission is free.

The garden was first established in 1696 as a medicinal plant garden in what is now the Julius Hospital's park in today's city center. Its first catalog, published in 1722, listed 423 types of plants including 52 from the region, as well as from the Mediterranean (127 varieties), South Africa (64), Asia (29), Central and South America (26), North America (21), and Atlantic islands (7). Its first greenhouse was built in 1722, with three additional greenhouses added in 1739-41; all were replaced by four new greenhouses in 1787-89. During the late 18th century, however, most of the medicinal plant garden was converted to ornamental gardens, and by 1791 only 3000 m² remained for medicinal plants. This space was intensively cultivated, however, and contained over 6000 species.

In 1833 the garden was reorganized by Linnaean taxonomy, and in 1854 was administratively assigned to the university proper rather than being held jointly with the hospital. As part of this new arrangement, the garden moved in 1854 onto university grounds, then moved again in 1873 to a site near the former Physics Institute, now marked by the X-ray Monument honoring the 1895 discovery of X-rays by Wilhelm Conrad Röntgen. Beginning in 1960 the garden moved to its current location in the city's outskirts, with the plant collections relocated in 1968 to a  garden, opening ceremony in 1971, and in 1978 an addition of a further 1.5 hectares.

Today the garden cultivates about 10,000 documented plant species, with specialized collections of plants such as tubers and onions, as well as rare native and exotic plants, and a collection honoring Würzburg naturalist Philipp Franz von Siebold (1796–1866) who explored the plants of Japan. The garden contains the following major areas:

 Julius-von-Sachs-Institute of Plant Sciences
 Tropical greenhouses
 Mediterranean courtyard
 Mediterranean greenhouse
 Mediterranean garden
 Alpine plants and alpine house
 Medicinal plants
 North American prairie plants and winter-hardy cacti
 Tree collection
 East Asian garden
 European forest and meadows
 Pond and marsh plants
 Agricultural crops
 Regional plants
 Peony collection

The garden's herbarium contains about 100,000 specimens, with its oldest documents dating to around 1810.

See also 
 List of botanical gardens in Germany

References 
 Buschbom, U., "Die Entwicklung des Würzburger Botanischen Gartens", in Vierhundert Jahre Universität Würzburg - Eine Festschrift, pages 567-600. Auftrag der Julius-Maximilians-Universität, P. Baumgart, Verlag Degener & Co., Neustadt a.d.Aisch, 1982.
 Buschbom, U., "Der Botanische Garten. In: Gärten und Grünanlagen in Würzburg - Ihre Entwicklung und Bedeutung, Eine Ausstellung des Staatsarchivs Würzburg und des Stadtarchivs Würzburg", pages 77–168, in Ausstellungskataloge der Staatl, Generaldirektion der Staatl, Archive Bayerns, Nr. 26, 1990.

External links

 Botanischer Garten der Universität Würzburg
 Garden map and descriptions (German)

Botanical gardens in Germany
Gardens in Bavaria